X-Sinner is an American hard rock band formed in 1988 by guitarist Greg Bishop. The band is known for having a very similar sound to that of AC/DC, Kix, and Def Leppard. Originating in the white  metal scene, the band has expanded their fan base into mainstream metal over the years. They were named the favorite new band of 1989 by the readers of HM Magazine. Their first two albums were produced by John Elefante, former lead singer of Kansas. The albums were released on Pakaderm Records and A&M Records. After the release of their fifth studio album, A World Covered in Blood, the band toured Europe, and performed in the U.S. and Canada. In addition to their concerts and festival appearances, they have opened for such metal bands as Warrant and Paul Dianno. The band performed live with members of Rex Scott's side project GX, and added that material to their live repertoire.

Members
Current
 Rex Scott - lead vocals, guitar
 Greg Bishop - lead guitar
 Rob Kniep - studio bass
 Glenn Thomas - live bass
 Craig Jeans - live drums
 Jonah Lewis - live bass

Former
 David Robbins - vocals (Get It)
 Mike Buckner - live drums  (1989–2013, Peace Treaty)

Discography

References

External links
X-Sinner interview at metalforjesus.org

American Christian metal musical groups
Christian rock groups from California
Heavy metal musical groups from California
Musical groups established in 1988
Musical groups disestablished in 2001
Musical groups reestablished in 2005
1988 establishments in California